Rafi Eliyahu (born 8 May 1951) is an Israeli former professional footballer that has played in Hapoel Be'er Sheva.

Honours

Club
 Hapoel Be'er Sheva

 Premier League:
 Winners (2): 1974/1975, 1975/1976
 State Cup:
 Runners-up (3): 1983/1984
 Super Cup:
 Winners (1): 1974/1975
 Runners-up (1): 1975/1976
 Lillian Cup:
 Runners-up (1): 1982, 1983
 Second League:
 Winners (1): 1970/1971
 Super Cup Second League:
 Winners (1): 1970/1971

References

1951 births
Living people
Israeli footballers
Hapoel Be'er Sheva F.C. players
Liga Leumit players
Footballers from Beersheba
Israeli people of Iranian-Jewish descent
Association football midfielders